HMS Sherborne Castle was a  constructed for the Royal Navy during the Second World War. Before completion, the ship was transferred to the Royal Canadian Navy and renamed HMCS Petrolia. During the war Petrolia saw service as a convoy escort. Following the war, the corvette was sold for mercantile use and renamed Maid of Athens in 1946 and in 1947, renamed Bharat Laxmi. The ship remained in service until 1965 when Bharat Laxmi was sold for breaking up.

Design and description
The Castle class were an improved corvette design over their predecessor . The Flower class was not considered acceptable for mid-Atlantic sailing and was only used on Atlantic convoy duty out of need. Though the Admiralty would have preferred s, the inability of many small shipyards to construct the larger ships required them to come up with a smaller vessel. The increased length of the Castle class over their predecessors and their improved hull form gave the Castles better speed and performance on patrol in the North Atlantic and an acceptable replacement for the Flowers. This, coupled with improved anti-submarine armament in the form of the Squid mortar led to a much more capable anti-submarine warfare (ASW) vessel. However, the design did have criticisms, mainly in the way it handled at low speeds and that the class's maximum speed was already slower than the speeds of the new U-boats they would be facing.

The ships had a complement of 120.

The ships were powered by two Admiralty three-drum boilers which created .

The corvettes were armed with one QF 4-inch Mk XIX gun mounted forward. Anti-air armament varied from 4 to 10 Oerlikon 20 mm cannons. For ASW purposes, the ships were equipped with one three-barreled Squid anti-submarine mortar with 81 projectiles. The ships also had two depth charge throwers and one depth charge rail on the stern that came with 15 depth charges.

The ships were equipped with Type 145 and Type 147B ASDIC. The Type 147B was tied to the Squid anti-submarine mortar and would automatically set the depth on the fuses of the projectiles until the moment of firing. A single Squid-launched attack had a success rate of 25%. The class was also provided with HF/DF and Type 277 radar.

Construction and career
Sherborne Castle, named after the castle in Dorset, was laid down on 21 June 1943 by Harland and Wolff at Belfast. At some point in 1943, the ship was transferred to the Royal Canadian Navy was launched on 24 February 1944. The corvette, now renamed Petrolia for the town in southern Ontario, was commissioned on 29 June 1944 with the pennant number K499.

Following commissioning, Petrolia was sent to Tobermory for workups before being assigned to the Mid-Ocean Escort Force as a member of the convoy escort group C-3 in July 1944. AS member of the group, the corvette remained a convoy escort for the rest of the war, returning to Canada in June 1945. In August 1945, the ship underwent a refit at Charlottetown, Prince Edward Island before being placed in reserve at Halifax, Nova Scotia in October.

Petrolia was sold for mercantile use on 8 March 1946 to Castle Sg Co SA and renamed Maid of Athens with a Panamanian registry. The ship was converted to a cargo ship with a gross register tonnage of 1,541 tons. In 1947, the ship's registry was transferred to Bombay, India and the vessel was sold to Bharat Line Ltd. and renamed Bharat Laxmi. Bharat Laxmi remained in service until May 1965, when the ship was broken up at Bombay.

References

Notes

Citations

Sources
 
 
 
 
 

 

Ships of the Royal Canadian Navy
1944 ships
Ships built in Belfast
Castle-class corvettes